Schoenicola is a genus of Old World warbler in the family Locustellidae. There are two species, both from peninsular India. The genus has been placed in the subfamily Megalurinae.

A 2018 study found that the African species brevirostris formerly placed in the genus Schoenicola and the Indian species S. platyurus were not closely related, with the Indian species being a sister of the bristled grassbird, which was considered as Chaetornis striata. The African species, fan-tailed grassbird, is now placed in its own monotypic genus Catriscus.

The genus currently contains the following species:

 Bristled grassbird (Schoenicola striatus)
 Broad-tailed grassbird (Schoenicola platyurus)

References

 
Taxonomy articles created by Polbot
Bird genera
Taxa named by Edward Blyth